Viktoria Petrovna Brezhneva (Denisova, Дени́сова, ; 11 December 1908 – 5 July 1995) was the wife of Soviet politician and longtime General Secretary Leonid Brezhnev. She was the mother of Yuri Brezhnev and Galina Brezhneva.

Biography

She was born in Belgorod in 1908 as Viktoria Petrovna Denisova (Дени́сова). It is claimed by historian Robert Service that she was of Jewish ancestry but Denisova herself has denied having any Jewish ancestry. She met Leonid Brezhnev in 1926 and they married in 1928. The following year, Viktoria gave birth to their first child, Galina. Four years later, their second child, Yuri, was born. Viktoria's relationship with Brezhnev was described as "old fashioned" and one that "without exaggeration [could] be called gentle".  

According to the memoirs of Brezhnev's relatives, Viktoria encouraged Brezhnev's materialistic outlook. During Brezhnev's General Secretaryship, Viktoria remained at the sidelines; she did not like attracting public attention. Her last appearance in public was at Brezhnev's state funeral in 1982. Following the death of Brezhnev, Viktoria lived on for another 13 years, dying after struggling for several years with diabetes in 1995. She lived in Brezhnev's old apartment for the remainder of her life. Her daughter, Galina, did not attend the funeral although the rest of the family did.

References

1908 births
1995 deaths
People from Belgorod
People from Belgorodsky Uyezd
Viktoria Brezhneva
Soviet women
Spouses of Russian and Soviet national leaders
Deaths from diabetes
Burials at Novodevichy Cemetery